Heterixalus andrakata is a species of frogs in the family Hyperoliidae endemic to Madagascar.
Its natural habitats are subtropical or tropical moist lowland forests, subtropical or tropical seasonally wet or flooded lowland grassland, swamps, freshwater marshes, intermittent freshwater marshes, urban areas, heavily degraded former forests, ponds, irrigated land, and seasonally flooded agricultural land.

References

Heterixalus
Endemic frogs of Madagascar
Taxonomy articles created by Polbot
Amphibians described in 1991